Khaibung is a Kuki village located in the Chümoukedima District of Nagaland.

Demographics 
Khaibung is situated in the Chümoukedima District of Nagaland. As per the Population Census 2011, there are a total 87 households in Khaibung. The total population of Khaibung is 437.

See also 
Chümoukedima District

References 

Villages in Chümoukedima district